The 1996 Atlantic Coast Conference men's basketball tournament took place from March 7–10 at the Greensboro Coliseum in Greensboro, North Carolina.  Wake Forest won their second consecutive tournament, defeating Georgia Tech, 75–74, in the title game.  Tim Duncan of Wake Forest was named tournament MVP.

Bracket

AP rankings at time of tournament

Awards and honors

Everett Case Award

All Tournament Teams

First Team

External links
 

Tournament
ACC men's basketball tournament
College sports tournaments in North Carolina
Basketball competitions in Greensboro, North Carolina
ACC men's basketball tournament
ACC men's basketball tournament